Colourist painting is characterised by the use of intense colour, which becomes the dominant feature of the resultant work of art, more important than its other qualities. This tendency in painting was foreshadowed by French Impressionism in the late 19th century, and came to prominence in the work of the Fauvists in the early 20th century. It has since surfaced in a variety of individual styles and art movements, outside France as well, the most prominent being the Scottish Colourists, the Polish Colourists (a.k.a. Kapists), or the American abstract Color Field painters. Pierre Bonnard, among others, was a colorist painter.

Modern art